Hippias was an ancient Greek sophist.

Hippias may also refer to:

Hippias (tyrant), tyrant of Athens, son of Peisistratos
Hippias Major and Hippias Minor, works by Plato
a fictional character in The Crown of Violet, a novel by Geoffrey Trease

See also 
 Hippia (disambiguation)